Garde alternée is a 2017 French comedy film directed by Alexandra Leclère.

Plot
A woman discovers that her husband has a mistress. She will then propose to the latter to share their life with her husband alternating one week out of two.

Cast
 Didier Bourdon : Jean
 Valérie Bonneton : Sandrine
 Isabelle Carré : Virginie
 Laurent Stocker : Michel
 Michel Vuillermoz : Félix
 Hélène Vincent : Sandrine's mother
 Jackie Berroyer : Sandrine's father
 Lise Lamétrie : The teacher

Production
Principal photography on the film began in April 2017 in Paris and ended in June 2017.

References

External links

2017 films
French comedy films
2010s French-language films
2017 comedy films
2010s French films
Pan-Européenne films